St. Paul's Evangelical Lutheran Church is a historic Evangelical Lutheran church in Liberty, Sullivan County, New York.  It was built in 1908 and is a modest Late Gothic Revival style building.  It is built of iron spot brick with limestone and terra cotta trim.  It features a gable roofed nave with and engaged side entrance tower.

It was added to the National Register of Historic Places in 1997.

References

Churches completed in 1908
20th-century Lutheran churches in the United States
Lutheran churches in New York (state)
Churches on the National Register of Historic Places in New York (state)
Gothic Revival church buildings in New York (state)
Churches in Sullivan County, New York
National Register of Historic Places in Sullivan County, New York
1908 establishments in New York (state)